Claustrophobia is the fear of confined spaces.

Claustrophobia may also refer to:

 Claustrophobia (2003 film), an American horror thriller
 Claustrophobia (2008 film), a Hong Kong romantic drama
 Claustrophobia, a 2011 film featuring Russell Harvard
 "Claustrophobia" (Code Lyoko), a television episode
 Claustrophobia (escape room), a Russian escape room franchise
 "Claustrophobia", a song by the Bee Gees from The Bee Gees Sing and Play 14 Barry Gibb Songs, 1965
 "Claustrophobia", a song by Lacuna Coil from Delirium, 2016